Johann Georg Conradi (1645 in Oettingen – 22 May 1699) was a German composer. He was, with Johann Theile, Nicolaus Adam Strungk, Johann Philipp Fortsch, Johann Wolfgang Franck and Johann Sigismund Kusser one of the main composers of the early Oper am Gänsemarkt.

References

1645 births
1699 deaths
17th-century classical composers
German Baroque composers
German male classical composers
German opera composers
Male opera composers
17th-century male musicians